Serpentine River may refer to:

 Serpentine River (Alaska), waterway on the Seward Peninsula
 Serpentine River (New Zealand)
 Serpentine River (Tasmania), Australia
 Serpentine River (Western Australia)
 Serpentine River (British Columbia), Canada
 Serpentine River (New Brunswick), Canada
 Serpentine River (Newfoundland), Canada
 Serpentine River (Québec), Canada
 The River Westbourne, London, England (formerly known as the Serpentine River)
 The Serpentine, London, England (lake formerly known as the Serpentine River)

See also 
 Serpentine (disambiguation)